Elizabeth "Liz" May (born 27 July 1983 in Luxembourg) is a female athlete from Luxembourg, who competed in triathlon from 2000 to 2013. May is a 2011 Aquathlon World Champion and is a 2009 European Championship silver medalist. May competed at the  Olympic triathlon at the 2004 Summer Olympics and 2008 Summer Olympics. She finished in seventeenth place in Athens with a total time of 2:08:29.22.

May is of Danish descent. She was educated at the European School (ESL) in Luxembourg City and has a Master of Laws from the University of Copenhagen.

Notable results
2011: 13th at the ITU World Cup, Yokohama JAP
2010: 11th at the ITU World Cup, Madrid ESP
2009: 4th at the ITU World Cup, London GBR
2009: 7th at the ITU World Cup, Yokohama JAP
2008: 5th at the ITU World Cup, Lorient FRA
2008: 5th at the ITU World Cup, Kitzbühl AUT
2008: 6th at the ITU World Cup, Madrid ESP
2008: 11th at the ITU World Cup, Richards Bay RSA
2008: 14th at the Triathlon World Championships, Vancouver CAN
2008: 41st at the Beijing 2008 Olympic Games
2007: 9th at the ITU World Cup, Beijing CHN
2007: 15th at the Triathlon World Championships, Hamburg GER
2007: 5th at the ITU World Cup, Vancouver CAN
2007: 5th at the ITU World Cup, Madrid ESP
2007: 4th at the ITU World Cup, Richards Bay RSA
2006: 3rd at the ITU World Cup, Beijing CHN
2006: 14th at the ITU World Cup, Hamburg GER
2006: 15th at the Triathlon World Championships, Lausanne SWR

References
 Profile

External links
Liz May official website

Alumni of the European Schools
Luxembourgian people of Danish descent
Luxembourgian female triathletes
Olympic triathletes of Luxembourg
Triathletes at the 2004 Summer Olympics
Triathletes at the 2008 Summer Olympics
1983 births
Living people
Sportspeople from Luxembourg City